Parque Lincoln, or Lincoln Park, is a city park in Mexico City, Mexico.

The park is located in the Polanco neighborhood of Mexico City (México, D. F.). There is a statue of Martin Luther King Jr. installed in the park, as well as a copy of Abraham Lincoln: The Man (also known as Standing Lincoln). The clock tower was built in 1937 and since 1992 it operates as an art gallery.

References

External links
 
 

Miguel Hidalgo, Mexico City
Parks in Mexico City
Polanco, Mexico City